The 2008 I-League U19 was the first edition of the I-League U19 as replacement for the National Football League (Under-19) which was folded before.

The tournament was held in September 2008 in Jamshedpur, Jharkhand with the I-League and I-League 2nd Division youth teams and academies.

All teams played the other teams in their group once and the group winners (4 group winners) and second placed (4 second placed) play in the quarterfinals. The winner qualifies for the semifinals and its winners play in the final. The Tata Football Academy won the first edition of the youth league.

Group stage
The 16 participating teams were divided into four groups and played against each other. The group winner and the second placed made it to the next round.

Group A

Group B

Group C

Group D

Final round

Quarterfinals

Semifinals

Finals

References

2008–09 in Indian football
I-League U19 seasons